The United States Army Ordnance Corps, formerly the United States Army Ordnance Department, is a sustainment branch of the United States Army, headquartered at Fort Lee, Virginia. The broad mission of the Ordnance Corps is to supply Army combat units with weapons and ammunition, including at times their procurement and maintenance.  Along with the Quartermaster Corps and Transportation Corps, it forms a critical component of the U.S. Army logistics system.

The U.S. Army Ordnance Corps mission is to support the development, production, acquisition, and sustainment of weapon systems, ammunition, missiles, electronics, and ground mobility materiel during peace and war to provide combat power to the U.S. Army. The officer in charge of the branch for doctrine, training, and professional development purposes is the Chief of Ordnance. The current Chief of Ordnance is Brigadier General Michael B. Lalor.

History

Colonial period to War of Independence
During the colonial era in America, each colony was responsible for its own supply of ordnance material and its own personnel to supervise it. The first written record of an ordnance officer in British colonial America was Samuel Sharpe in the Massachusetts Bay Colony appointed in 1629 as Master Gunner of Ordnance. By 1645, the Massachusetts Bay Colony had a permanent Surveyor of Ordnance officer. By the time of the American Revolution, every colony had their own ordnance organization responsible for the procurement, distribution, supply, storage, and maintenance of munitions for the colony.

In July 1775, Ezekiel Cheever was appointed by General George Washington as Commissary of Artillery Stores, soon to be called Commissary of Military Stores with Major General Henry Knox, the Chief of Artillery. He was the civilian in charge of ordnance support for Washington's army in the field. By the end of the American Revolution, every brigade had ordnance personnel, usually civilian, providing munitions support to the soldiers in the field.

In 1776, the Board of War and Ordnance was established to oversee the conduct of the war. This board selected Benjamin Flower to be the Commissary General of Military Stores. Benjamin Flower was given the rank of Colonel and served in that capacity throughout the American Revolution. The Commissary General of Military Stores was an echelon above the Commissary of Military Stores in the field. His responsibility was to recruit and train artificers, establish ordnance facilities, and to distribute arms and ammunition to the army in the field. In 1777, a powder magazine was established at Carlisle, Pennsylvania and a foundry at Springfield, Massachusetts.

Ordnance in the early republic
In the early years of the 19th century, the ordnance profession played a key role in the burgeoning industrial revolution in America. In 1794, President Washington established the two federal armories; the Springfield Armory in Massachusetts and the Harpers Ferry Armory in Virginia. At these locations, early developments and innovations striving towards interchangeable parts were achieved. Inventors such as Thomas Blanchard, Simeon North, John Hall, and Eli Whitney would perfect the methods and means for mass production. Growing out of the technical innovations of the arms industry, these methods would be widely adopted by American industry by the middle of the 19th century, establishing what has become known as the American system of manufacturing.

On 14 May 1812, as part of the preparation for the War of 1812, Congress established the Ordnance Department. It was responsible for arms and ammunition production, acquisition, distribution, and storage or ordnance materiel for the U.S. Army. The act also created a new position, the Commissary General of Ordnance. Colonel Decius Wadsworth, former Superintendent of the U.S. Military Academy at West Point, was chosen as the Commissary General of Ordnance. The act also directed the new Commissary General of Ordnance, soon renamed to Chief of Ordnance, to "enlist artisans and laborers to direct the inspection and proof of all cannon and small arms to direct the construction of gun carriages equipments implements and ammunition to make estimates and contracts for and purchases of ordnance supplies and stores and to issue them to the army to exact from armories and arsenals quarterly returns of property and to receive from all responsible officers reports of damages to ordnance materiel to establish ordnance depots to prepare regulations for the government of the Ordnance Department and forms of returns and reports".

Wadsworth also took great care in establishing and supervising the training of officers who would join the Ordnance Department. Coming from West Point, these officers, such as Alfred Mordecai and George Bomford, were highly trained in mechanical and chemical engineering and were among the highest ranking of graduating cadets from West Point. These new ordnance officers were usually detailed to the Springfield or Harpers Ferry Armory, or to one of the various arsenals across the growing country, to conduct scientific and industrial experiments in metallurgy, chemistry, or one of the allied engineering fields.

In 1832, the Ordnance Department established the non-commissioned officer rank of Ordnance Sergeant to be in charge of the ordnance stores at any of the growing number of Army forts and establishments across the country. This rank will remain until the reorganization of the Army under the National Defense Act of 1920.

During the Mexican–American War, the Ordnance Department established the Ordnance Rocket and Howitzer Battery to service the then new M1841 12-pound howitzers and Hale war rockets, which had not yet entered Army service and were still being tested. This was the only Ordnance unit established primarily for a combat role. This unit included junior Army officers who would serve as senior leaders in the Civil War; including Jesse Reno and Benjamin Huger.

Civil War and post Civil War 
During the war, the Ordnance Department furnished 90 million pounds of lead, 13 million pounds of artillery projectiles, and 26 million pounds of powder for a Union Army of over 1 million soldiers. However, despite the growth of the Army, the Ordnance Department did not grow in a corresponding manner. By the end of the war, it numbered only 64 officers and approximately 600 soldiers, officially. Yet, to support the ordnance needs of the Army, officers and soldiers who had civilian experience in ordnance responsibilities (i.e. blacksmiths, etc ...) were assigned additional duty in their units, so that every unit, company-echelon and above, had someone assigned in ordnance responsibilities.

For those few ordnance officers who had been part of the pre-war Army, several of them accepted line positions, such as Major Generals Oliver O. Howard and Jesse Reno. Most, however, remained in the Ordnance Department and rose in rank to serve as ordnance officers at one of the various arsenals or senior ordnance command for the Union Army, i.e. in the Army of the Potomac. About half of the ordnance officers left to join the Confederacy, including its sole Chief of Ordnance during the war, Josiah Gorgas.

By 1872, the Ordnance Department reflected the Army's return to a small peacetime status with 50 officers, 475 enlisted soldiers, and 1,738 civilian workers. Despite this constriction, the Ordnance Department continued its tradition of technological innovation and increased professionalism. Ordnance officers, including the Chiefs of Ordnance – Stephen Vincent Benet, Daniel Flagler, Adelbert Rinaldo Buffington – refined, improved, and even invented new ordnance materiel. Steel breech-loading artillery, machine gun development, smokeless powder, improved gun carriages, officer promotion via examination, and training through apprenticeship at government arsenals and shops characterized the Ordnance Department during the latter 19th century. In 1874, the first dedicated proving ground was established at Sandy Hook, New Jersey. Watervliet Arsenal was chosen as the location for the first federal cannon foundry in 1887 and a seacoast cannon shop was added in 1889.

World War I
Even though World War I had been raging in Europe for nearly three years, the Ordnance Department had to play catch-up when the United States entered the war. With only 97 officers and 1,241 enlisted soldiers, the department had a myriad of problems to overcome:
no system below the Office of the Chief of Ordnance to coordinate with industry,
no plan for mobilizing industry,
an inadequate proving ground,
no system of echeloned maintenance,
a lack of sufficient schooling for enlisted Soldiers,
and only 6 armories and manufacturing arsenals at Watervliet; Springfield and Watertown, Massachusetts; Picatinny, New Jersey; Frankford, Pennsylvania; and Rock Island, Illinois.

However, by the end of the war, it had solved all these problems, matured as an organization, and adapted to modern, mechanized warfare. It established an embryonic process for echelon-based maintenance for field units, a tradition of ordnance education at one of the officer or enlisted ordnance schools, a new proving ground at Aberdeen, Maryland, and a plan to coordinate production and mobilize industry.

The Ordnance Department established 13 Ordnance districts across the country that had the authority to deal directly with industry and award contracts. By the end of the war, almost 8,000 plants were working on Ordnance contracts. To offset industry’s reluctance to build new plants, the U.S. Government established a system of constructing the factories but contracting out their operation. By the war’s end, 326 Government facilities were operating under the auspices of contractors. This practice would be employed even more successfully during World War II.

By the end of the war, the Ordnance Department numbered 5,954 officers and 62,047 enlisted soldiers, with 22,700 of those officers and soldiers serving in the American Expeditionary Force in France.

World War II
During World War II, the Ordnance Department was responsible for roughly half of all Army procurement, $34 billion. President Franklin Delano Roosevelt's 'Arsenal of Democracy' depended on the Ordnance Department to become a reality. Ordnance Department strength increased from 334 officers to 24,000 officers, 4,000 enlisted to 325,000 enlisted, and 27,088 civilians to 262,000 civilians. Ordnance soldiers and civilians worked across the globe, in places as diverse as Iceland, Iran, the Pacific Islands, Africa, Europe, and the Middle East. Aberdeen Proving Ground expanded exponentially and headquartered The Ordnance School, the Ordnance Replacement Training Center, the new Bomb Disposal School, and the Ordnance Unit Training Center.

The ordnance mission in the field operated on a scale never experienced previously by the Ordnance Department. During World War II, the Ordnance Branch gained its third core competency, Bomb Disposal (renamed Explosive Ordnance Disposal after WWII) added to its previous missions of ammunition handling and maintenance. By war's end, there were more than 2,200 ordnance units of approximately 40 types, ranging in size from squads to regiments.

Beginning in 1942, with the authorization of the Chief of Ordnance, a computing branch at the University of Pennsylvania's Moore School of Electrical Engineering was established as a substation of Aberdeen Proving Ground under the code name "Project PX". On 15 February 1946, the Electronic Numerical Integrator and Computer (ENIAC), the world's first general-purpose electronic computer, was formally dedicated. ENIAC was designed to calculate artillery firing tables for the United States Army Ballistic Research Laboratory. The ENIAC's first use was in calculations for the hydrogen bomb.

In August 1945, Colonel Holger Toftoy, head of the Rocket Branch of the Research and Development Division of the US Army's Ordnance Department, offered initial one-year contracts to German rocket scientists as part of Operation Paperclip, a program used to recruit the scientists from Nazi Germany for employment by the United States; 127 of them accepted. In September 1945, the first group of seven rocket scientists arrived at Fort Strong, New York and then moving to Fort Bliss, Texas, in January 1946.

In 1949, the German scientists were transferred from the White Sands Missile Range Fort Bliss Range Complex to the Redstone Arsenal Ordnance Rocket Center.

Post-war era
Per the Army Reorganization Act of 1950, the Ordnance Department was renamed the Ordnance Corps. With the outbreak of the Korean War, the Ordnance Corps largely re-established its successful procedures from World War II. It reactivated the various schools and units at Aberdeen Proving Ground, which had been dis-established following the end of World War II, to serve the Korea effort. It continued its tradition of echeloned-based maintenance and increased the rapidity of maintenance and ammunition supply and repair. Explosive Ordnance Disposal, formerly Bomb Disposal Squads, improved their procedures with a focus on Russian and Chinese ordnance.

In Vietnam, the capabilities of Explosive Ordnance Disposal became increasingly important due to the nature of a war with no front lines. EOD and other ordnance units work under the auspices of the 1st Logistical Command, which divided the country into four support zones. Despite the difficult circumstances, the operational readiness rates increased and by 1969 exceeded those of previous wars.

From 1962 to 2008

In 1962 the Ordnance Corps and the office of the Chief of Ordnance were disestablished. The Ordnance Branch (along with the Transportation and Quartermaster Branches) was placed under the supervision of the Army's Deputy Chief of Staff for Logistics. Army Materiel Command assumed responsibility for Ordnance's historical tasks of research and development; procurement, production, and storage; and technical intelligence. Combat Development Command assumed responsibility for developing the Army's organization and doctrine. The Ordnance Center and School trained personnel in ammunition handling, maintenance, and Explosive Ordnance Disposal and was under the direction of Continental Army Command (CONARC).

The Ordnance Corps was reestablished on 28 October 1985.

Post cold war
In 2008, the Ordnance Corps consolidated the Ordnance Mechanical Maintenance School from Aberdeen Proving Ground and the United States Army Ordnance Munitions and Electronic Maintenance School from Redstone Arsenal into a single training facility based at Fort Lee, Virginia as a part of the 2005 Base Closure and Realignment Commission (BRAC) decision. With an entirely new campus dedicated to the training of all ranks of ordnance soldiers and civilians, the Ordnance Corps maintains its commitment to the life-cycle sustainment of the Army's materiel from cradle to grave, providing ammunition, and protecting the Army's forces through EOD operations.

Heraldic items and traditions

Branch insignia
The Ordnance Corps branch insignia is represented by the "shell and flame". It is considered to be the oldest branch insignia in the U.S. Army. This symbol has been used since the 17th century by various armies of Western Europe, including British and French forces, and was considered a common symbol used by the military. Ordnance officers began wearing the symbol in 1832 and have been wearing it ever since. There have been a multiplicity of designs throughout the years, but the current design was adopted in 1936.

Branch plaque
The plaque design has the branch insignia, letters, and rim in gold. The background is crimson.

Regimental insignia

The regimental insignia for the Ordnance Corps is a gold color metal and enamel device 1 1/8 inches in height overall consisting of two gray antique cannons in saltire on a white disc behind an encircling scroll in the form of a buckle red belt with, between the intersecting cannons and the belt, a black antique bomb, its scarlet flames issuing at the top of the device from behind the belt, which bears the inscription "ORDNANCE CORPS U.S.A." in gold letters. It is worn on the right side of the uniform, above any unit citations.

The crossed cannons are representative of the Ordnance Corps's early relationship to the Artillery. The flaming bomb, also known as the shell and flame, represents the armament of days gone by, while the energy it connotes is applicable to the weapons of our own day. The cannoneer's belt, which encircles the flaming bomb and crossed cannons, is embossed with the words "ORDNANCE CORPS U.S.A." and represents the traditional association between munitions and armament. The white background symbolizes the Ordnance Corps's motto, "ARMAMENT FOR PEACE".

Ordnance soldier's creed
As an Ordnance Soldier of the United States Army, I will utilize every available talent and means to ensure that superior mobility, firepower, and communications are advantages enjoyed by the United States Army over its enemies. As an Ordnance Soldier, I fully understand my duty to perform under adverse conditions and I will continually strive to perfect my craft. I will remain flexible so that I can meet any emergency. In my conduct, I will abide by the Soldier's code. In my support mission in the field, I will use every available skill to maintain superiority; I will always be tactically and technically proficient As an Ordnance soldier, I have no greater task.

Army ordnance song
The words and music to Arms for the Love of America were originally composed by Irving Berlin and published by the Army Ordnance Association in 1941. It was dedicated to Major General C.M. Wesson, the Chief of Ordnance from 1938 to 1942.

The Ordnance Order of Samuel Sharpe

On 26 February 1628 the Court of Assistants in London, England directed that "five pieces of ordnance and a great quantity of other arms and great shot" belonging to a settlement near modern-day Salem, Massachusetts be placed under the control of Mr. Samuel Sharpe, making him the first European "Master Gunner of our Ordnance" on the American continent.

U.S. Army Ordnance Corps personnel

Chiefs of Ordnance

The head of the Ordnance Corps Branch is the Chief of Ordnance. In addition, the Ordnance Corps Command Sergeant Major and the Ordnance Corps Chief Warrant Officer assist the Chief of Ordnance with the supervising of the health, training, and welfare of the Soldiers, Warrant Officers, and Officers of the Ordnance Branch. In addition, the Chief of Ordnance holds a secondary hat as the Commandant of the Ordnance School at Fort Lee, Virginia. As of 2020, there have been 42 Chiefs of Ordnance in the U.S. Army.

Commissioned officer areas of concentration (AOC)
89E Explosive Ordnance Disposal Officer
91A Materiel Maintenance and Munitions Management Officer

Warrant officer military occupational specialties
890A Ammunition Warrant Officer
913A Armament Systems Maintenance Warrant Officer
914A Allied Trades Warrant Officer
915A Automotive Maintenance Warrant Officer
915E Senior Ordnance Logistics Warrant Officer
919A Engineer Equipment Maintenance Warrant Officer
948B Electronics System Maintenance Warrant Officer
948D Electronic Missile Systems Maintenance Warrant Officer
948E Senior Electronics Maintenance Warrant Officer

Enlisted military occupational specialties (MOS)

The Ordnance Training and Heritage Center
The United States Army Ordnance Museum was formed at Aberdeen Proving Ground, Maryland in 1919. In 2010, the museum was closed and reformed at Fort Lee as the U.S. Army Ordnance Training and Heritage Center.

References

Bibliography

External links
The Official Website of the U.S. Ordnance Corps
The United States Army Ordnance Corps Association

Branches of the United States Army
Ordnance
Ordnance
1812 establishments in the United States